Oryol is a city in Russia.

Oryol may also refer to:


Places
 Oryol Oblast, a federal subject of Russia, of which Oryol is the capital
 Oryol Governorate, an administrative unit of the Russian Empire from 1796 to 1928
 Oryol electoral district (Russian Constituent Assembly election, 1917), covering the governorate
 Oryol, Vologda Oblast, Russia, a village

Technology
 Oryol, a military radar set featured on Sukhoi Su-11 and Sukhoi Su-15 airplanes, among others
 Oryol or Orel (spacecraft), a project to develop a partially reusable crewed spacecraft
 Oryol, code name for a release of Astra Linux, a Russian Linux-based computer operating system

Other uses
 Oryol State University, in the city of Oryol
 FC Oryol, a football club based in the city of Oryol
 Russian ship Oryol, various Imperial Russian Navy ships

See also
 Orel (disambiguation), an alternate spelling